Homorod may refer to several entities in Romania:

 Homorod, Brașov, commune in Brașov County
 Homorod, a village in Geoagiu Town, Hunedoara County
 Băile Homorod, a village in Vlăhița Town, Harghita County
 Homorod (Dumbrăvița), left tributary of the Olt in eastern Brașov County
 Homorod (Homorod), right tributary of the Olt in northern Brașov County
 Homorod (Mureș), tributary of the Mureș in Hunedoara County
 Homorod, tributary of the Sârbi in Hunedoara County
 Homorod (Someș), tributary of the Homorodul Nou (Someș basin) in Satu Mare County